Alwiya al-Furqan (Criterion Brigades) is an independent Islamist rebel group involved in the Syrian Civil War. It claimed to be the largest Islamist rebel faction that operated in the eastern Quneitra Governorate and Damascus. The group also held ties to Jordan which allowed fighters from the group to cross into the country to receive medical aid. During a sermon the group's leader stated that the Syrian opposition was building a Caliphate in Syria, that the rebels should emulate the Prophet Muhammad and his companions in doing so.

History
In May 2013, after the split between the al-Nusra Front and Islamic State of Iraq after the latter's deceleration of a merger between the two and establishment of the Islamic State of Iraq and the Levant, the group released a statement critical of al-Nusra's leader Abu Mohammad al-Joulani for his pledge of allegiance to al-Qaeda in light of the dispute. 

In 2013, after a chemical weapons attack in Eastern Ghouta, ISIL and al-Nusra conducted separate revenge attacks, Alwiya al-Furqa, Ahrar al-Sham and the Jesus Son of Mary Battalions joined the ISIL-led attacks which were code named "Volcano of Rage", and shelled Alawite neighborhoods in Damascus, areas near the Embassy of Russia in Damascus and the Four Seasons Hotel Damascus, where UN observers were reportedly staying to investigate the chemical attack.

In September 2013, the group joined a joint operations room with Ahrar al-Sham and Jaysh al-Islam.

In 2017 the group released a statement saying the group would end its cease-fire with the Syrian government in Damascus if Hezbollah or IRGC affiliated groups entered the area.

See also
List of armed groups in the Syrian Civil War

References

External links
 

Anti-government factions of the Syrian civil war
Sunni Islamist groups
Arab militant groups
Islamism in Syria
Jihadist groups in Syria
Free Syrian Army